Graduation is the twelfth studio album by Japanese Pop band Deen. It was released on 15 June 2011 under music label Ariola Japan.

Background
The album consists of only one previously released single, Brand New Wing.

Nine out of eleven tracks have title tracks borrowed from the chronologically release order of studio albums.

Leader Kouji Yamane's original song Shanghai Rock Star had received continuation (Episode 2) for the first time since the album Deen Next Stage.

This album was released in two formats: regular CD edition and limited A/B CD+DVD edition. The limited edition A includes compilation CD of ballads under the title Ballads in Blue II〜The greatest hits of DEEN〜. The limited edition B includes DVD of footage from their live performance  Deen Live Joy Break-15 ~History~.

Charting performance
The album reached #19 in its first week and charted for 2 weeks, selling 6,000+ copies.

Track listing

In media
Brand New Wing - theme song for the Nihon TV music program Happy Music

References

Sony Music albums
Japanese-language albums
2011 albums
Deen (band) albums